Famines in Ethiopia have occurred periodically throughout the history of the country, which was formerly known as Abyssinia.

The economy was based on subsistence agriculture, with an aristocracy that consumed the surplus. Due to a number of causes, the peasants have lacked incentives to either improve production or to store their excess crops; as a result, they lived from harvest to harvest. Despite the extensive modernization and land reform in the country during the last 120 years, especially under Emperor Haile Selassie, as of 2016, about 80% of the population are poor farmers who still live from harvest to harvest and are vulnerable to crop failures.

List of famines

See also
 1958–1975 Wollo–Tigray famine
 Agriculture in Ethiopia
 Food security in Ethiopia
 List of famines

References

External links
 Disaster Prevention and Preparedness Agency (DPPA) of Ethiopia Home page

Ethiopia
History of Ethiopia
Food and drink in Ethiopia